Wellington is a market town and civil parish in the borough of Telford and Wrekin, in Shropshire, England. It is situated 4 miles (6 km) northwest of Telford and 12 miles (19 km) east of Shrewsbury. The summit of The Wrekin lies 3 miles southwest of the town. The population of the town was 25,554 in 2011. It also has good bus services making it one of the most accessible towns in Shropshire.

History

A church has stood for almost 1,000 years and a priest is mentioned in the Domesday Book.  The original churchyard still remains. A new church, dedicated to All Saints, designed by George Steuart, was built in 1789.

Wellington's first market charter was granted to Giles of Erdington, lord of the manor, in 1244 and a market still exists today. The market had an open-sided market hall by 1680, and possibly much earlier, but it was dismantled in about 1805. In 1841 a market company was formed to purchase the market rights from Lord Forester in 1856. In 1848 the company built a town hall with the butter market below, creating a permanent covered space for traders. 
 
The first Shropshire Olympian Games, organised by celebrated Olympic revivalist Dr William Penny Brookes, were held in Wellington in May 1861. In August 1868 the town hosted the third National Olympian Games, organised  by the National Olympian Association co-founded by Brookes, when their intended venue at Manchester had become unavailable.

To the northeast of the town is the site of Apley Castle, originally a fourteenth-century fortified manor house, the remains of which were converted into a stable block with the building of a grand Georgian house, which was itself demolished in 1955.  The surviving stable block has been converted into apartments and retains some medieval features.

The creation of Telford
Dawley New Town was designated by the government in 1963, and was expanded to encompass Wellington in 1968 under the new name of Telford, named for the great engineer and first county surveyor of Shropshire, Thomas Telford. The creation of Telford has divided opinion in Wellington ever since, with some celebrating the jobs and investment it brought to the area and others bemoaning the negative impact on Wellington's own economy – as well as its status and sense of identity. The development of Telford Town Centre and local retail parks since the 1970s had an adverse effect on Wellington's retail centre. The local football team's name was changed from Wellington Town to Telford United in 1969.

For many years, local politics left Wellington in conflict with Wrekin District (now Telford and Wrekin Council), with claims and counterclaims of neglect. In the 21st century, however, the borough council has invested heavily in the town. Chief amongst these investments has been the redeveloped Wellington Civic and Leisure Centre near the centre of the town, which has brought together the library, town council, swimming pool and gym, along with a modern register office. 200 borough council officers are also located at the new complex.

Shopping and local businesses
The area's largest employers are located in nearby areas of Telford, with Wellington itself housing hundreds of small businesses in its shops, offices and small manufacturing units. A range of nationwide chains have branches in Wellington.

Attractions
The Wrekin, one of Shropshire's most famous landmarks, is the most northern part of the Shropshire Hills Area of Outstanding Natural Beauty. Located just 2.5 miles from the centre of Wellington, it attracts tens of thousands of walkers and cyclists to the town every year.

Located in the town's Victorian market hall, Wellington Market operates four days a week and houses over 100 stalls. A Farmers' Market takes place on the fourth Saturday of the month, bringing together several Shropshire food producers and retailers in the market's historic home of Market Square.

A short walk from the centre of the town is Sunnycroft, a Victorian villa and mini-estate now owned and run by the National Trust.

The New Buck's Head football stadium, home to A.F.C. Telford United, is in Wellington.  Other sporting clubs include the Wellington Cricket Club, currently in the Birmingham League Premier Division, and Wrekin Golf Club.

Wellington is home to the Belfrey Theatre, an amateur venue run by the Wellington Theatre Company which offers an annual season of plays and other shows.

Events
The area's music and theatre groups host performances throughout the year, and there are craft markets at both Belmont Hall and Christ Church.

In March, the town marks Charter Day, when the 1244 charter is delivered by a messenger on horseback. A jury then convenes in the Market Square to appoint the town crier, ale taster and market clerk for the year ahead.

During the summer, around 40 events take place in and around the town, including the historically inspired Midsummer Fayre, the town carnival and Lions Day at Bowring Park, and the Wellington Walking Festival. Sounds in The Square brings live music to the heart of the town across weekends in July and August, and various concerts and fetes complete the programme.

The Wellington Arts Festival runs every October, and offers a variety of events including plays, music, exhibitions, literature and poetry.

There is now a cinema in Market Square, Wellington, called The Wellington Orbit, which is operated by a team of volunteers. On their website it claims to be "Telford's only independent cinema."

Education and health services
Wellington is the main education centre for the borough. Telford College and the independent school Wrekin College are located around the outskirts of the town, along with several primary and secondary schools.

The Princess Royal Hospital – one of Shropshire's two main hospitals – is located just outside the town at Apley, as is the Severn Hospice. Within the town itself, Wellington Health Centre is the main GP practice.

Transport history
Wellington has road links, centrally located railway and bus stations, and a position on routes 45 and 81 of the National Cycle Network.

Railway links 
Wellington railway station was built in 1849 and has three platforms, served by Avanti West Coast (which replaced Virgin Trains West Coast), Transport for Wales, and West Midlands Trains providing northbound trains towards Shrewsbury and Wales, and southbound trains to the West Midlands and London Euston. One of the platforms is a bay platform, which sees little use at present. Additionally, from 2008 to 2011 the town had a through train service to London Marylebone operated by Wrexham & Shropshire, the first for almost 40 years.

In 1867, a branch line was opened to connect the town with Market Drayton. The Wellington and Market Drayton Railway operated for just under one hundred years before closure under the Beeching Axe in 1963. The line remained open for goods only services until 1967, when this service was also withdrawn. The track was lifted in 1970.

There were also railway links to Much Wenlock (closed 1962) and Stafford, which closed in the late 1960s.

A goods only link to a rail head at Donnington, on part of the former Wellington to Stafford line, has been re-opened. There has been some campaigning to re-open the whole of the line from Shrewsbury to Stafford through Wellington, Leegomery, Hadley, Trench, Donnington, and Newport.

Bus links 

After World War I, BMMO (Birmingham Midland "Red" Motor Company) expanded it's depots out from Birmingham to other towns and cities in the Midlands, including Shrewsbury, which would later lead to them opening a depot on Charlton St on Thursday 21st July 1932 after closing the Shrewsbury depot in the same month. BMMO was later renamed to MROC (Midland Red Omnibus Company Limited) in March 1974 and was split up in September 1981 to become Midland Red (North) Limited, with whom the depot was taken control of.

Midland Red North was later acquired by the Cowie Group on 1st August 1996, who would rename and become Arriva plc on 6th November 1997, making Midland Red North become what is now the current operator that serves Wellington and Telford, Arriva Midlands North.

After 80 years of the Charlton St depot being in operation, it would be closed by Arriva in April 2012 and demolished in summer of 2015. The fleet and staff from the Charlton St depot were moved to a new premises on Stafford Park prior to its demolition.

The current services operated by Arriva in Wellington are:

 4 - Madeley and Leegomery
 4a - Telford Centre
 7 - Wellington and Telford Centre
 15 - Arleston and Telford Centre
 16 - Telford Centre and Rodington
 17 - Leegomery and Shrewsbury

In late 2022, the Telford and Wrekin council introduced the Travel Telford services operated by Chaserider and Select Bus Services. These services are:

 100 Travel Telford - Madeley
 101 - Madeley
 102 - Newport
 103 - Newport

Community projects
A number of community organisations are active in the town, including Wellington's 'Walkers are Welcome' Group which organises regular walks around the area in addition to the annual Walking Festival, and Wellington H2A promoting arts and heritage in the town through a range of events. Local history and heritage are promoted by Wellington History Group and Wellington Civic Society. A twinning group exists to maintain links with Wellington's twin town of Chatenay-Malabry in France.

Amongst current community projects are the Peace Garden, started by local nonagenarian George Evans (died 2020), and the ambitious project to return a cinema to the town for the first time since the closure of the Clifton almost three decades ago. In June 2019, the Wellington Orbit was officially opened, bringing a cafe, bar and cinema to the centre of the town.

Twin towns 
Wellington is twinned with:

Notable people

The town's literary claims to fame include it being the birthplace of 19th-century evangelical religious writer Hesba Stretton (1832–1911), and the first job of poet Philip Larkin (1922-1985) was as librarian of Wellington Library from 1943 to 1946. Larkin described Wellington as a "hole full of toad's turds" and stated that his job as town librarian was to "hand out tripey novels to morons". 
A walkway at the side of Wellington Library was named Larkin Way in honour of Philip Larkin, but this pathway was lost during re-development work on the library. Larkin Way, in a slightly modified form, still exists. The address of Wellington Civic and Leisure Centre is Larkin Way, Tan Bank, Wellington, Telford, TF1 1LX.

The Rev Patrick Brontë lived in the town for a year while serving a curacy before moving to Yorkshire and meeting his future wife there, Maria Branwell. The abolitionist Dr William Withering was born in the town in 1741; he also investigated digitalis, used in the treatment of heart disease. Several members of the pop group T'Pau, including vocalist Carol Decker and keyboardist Michael Chetwood, grew up in Wellington – the latter returning to run a music shop in the town.

Other notable people born, educated or prominent in Wellington include:

 Thomas Leigh (1504–1571), born there, Lord Mayor of London 1558-59
 Richard Baxter (1615–1691), puritan church leader and scholar.
 George Downing (1685–1749), politician, founder of Downing College, Cambridge. He was brought up in the household of his maternal aunt at Dothill Park, her husband being politician Sir William Forester (1655-1718).
 Andrew Plimer (c. 1763–1837), miniature painter.
 Edward Pryce Owen (1788–1863), artist, was vicar of Wellington 1823-1840
 Richard Padmore (1789–1881), Liberal politician and industrialist, born there
 Henry John Gauntlett (1805–1876), composer, organist and organ designer, born there when his father Henry Gauntlett (1762-1833) was curate at the parish church
 Robert William Eyton (1815–1881), antiquary, born there, son of local vicar
 John Dickson (circa 1819–1892), railway contractor, lived in Wellington between 1847 and 1854 before relocating to South Wales. He founded a Shropshire Works to make railway equipment locally and was buried in All Saints' Churchyard.
 Cecil Lawson (1849–1882), landscape artist, born there
 David Cranage (1866–1957), Church of England clergyman who became Dean of Norwich and writer, was son of a family whose home was at The Old Hall, Wellington (now preparatory school).
 William Allison White (1894–1974), World War I Victoria Cross recipient, died there.
 George Ambler Wilson (1906–1977), civil engineer, born there.
 Len Murray (1922–2004), trade union leader, educated at Wellington Grammar School.
 Peter Vaughan (1923–2016) actor, lived in Wellington before moving to Staffordshire at age seven.
 Brian Epstein (1934–1967), manager of The Beatles studied at Wrekin College.
 Gerry Fowler (1935-1993), Labour Party politician, lived there while MP for The Wrekin and local councillor.
 Nigel Rogers (1936-2022), tenor opera singer and musical conductor, born there.
 Tony McPhee (b. 1944), lead guitarist, and founder of blues/rock band The Groundhogs.
 Paulette Wilson (1956-2020), immigration rights activist, was brought up here after her parents arrived from Jamaica.
 Richard Cousins (1959-2017), businessman, CEO Compass Group, lived here in the late 1980s and was active in its local Cricket Club.
 Stewart Lee (b. 1968), comedian, born there.
 Paul Blackthorne (b. 1969), American-based actor, born there.

Sports
 John Parton (1863–1906), cricketer, born there
 Alf Littlehales (1867–1942), footballer, born there; played for Wolves, Stoke City and Southampton.
 Jackery Jones (1877–1945), footballer, born there, played for Wolves.
 Billy Scarratt (1878–1958), footballer, born and died there, played notably for Shrewsbury Town.
 Watty Corbett (1880–1960), footballer, born there; player for Aston Villa and England international who won gold medal in 1908 Summer Olympics.
 Charlie Millington (1882–1945), footballer who appeared in Football League for Aston Villa, Fulham and Birmingham City, died there.
 Harry Hampton (1885–1963), footballer, born there, brought up in Victoria Street, played for Wellington Town before, and after, his more distinguished playing for Aston Villa.
 George Davies (1900–1942), footballer, born there, played for Birmingham City and Southend United.
 Tommy Pritchard (1904–1968), footballer, born there, played especially for Wolves and Charlton Athletic.
 Des Fawcett (1905–1968), footballer who played in over 300 Football League matches for six clubs, ending his play career with Wellington Town; died there.
 Tommy Nicholls (1931–2021), featherweight boxer who competed at 1952 and 1956 Olympics.
 Peter Thornley (b. 1941), professional wrestler best known for the ring character Kendo Nagasaki, born there
 Tony Parton (b. 1967), cricketer, born there.
 Adam Byram (b. 1971), cricketer, born there.
 Kamran Sheeraz (b. 1973), cricketer, born there.

See also
Listed buildings in Wellington, Shropshire

References

External links

Wellington Town Council
Wellington History Group
Wellington Chamber of Commerce
Telford Culture Zone

 
Market towns in Shropshire
Telford
Towns in Shropshire